Nicola Martial (born 13 March 1974) is a Guyanese athlete. She competed in the women's triple jump at the 1996 Summer Olympics.

References

1974 births
Living people
Athletes (track and field) at the 1996 Summer Olympics
Guyanese female triple jumpers
Olympic athletes of Guyana
Athletes (track and field) at the 1995 Pan American Games
Pan American Games competitors for Guyana
Place of birth missing (living people)